Archbold Stadium was a multi-purpose stadium in Syracuse, New York. It opened in 1907 and was home to the Syracuse Orangemen football team prior to the opening of the Carrier Dome in 1980.

History 
After organizing athletics events at various Star Parks around the city, the university wanted the center of athletics on campus, and created the Old Oval. The athletics program quickly outgrew the multi-purpose field and the Oval was no longer considered a suitable location for such events.

The stadium was named for John D. Archbold, who donated $600,000 for the project. He was also responsible for funding towards the building of Archbold Gymnasium, located just to the east overlooking the stadium. The stadium was built entirely of concrete in the excavated hill side and seated over 25,000 spectators.

Construction of the stadium took place from May 1, 1905 to 1907. Upon its completion in 1907, Archbold Stadium was touted as the "Greatest Athletic Arena in America". The stadium displaced Harvard Stadium as the largest concrete stadium in the nation.  At the time of its construction, it was one of only three concrete stadiums in the world.

In the first game played at the stadium on September 25, 1907, Syracuse Orangemen beat rival Hobart by a score of 28-0. The Orange football went 265-112-20 all-time (from 1907 until 1978), and at times were nearly unbeatable. From 1915 to 1927, Syracuse achieved a remarkable home record of 61-10-6. Then, during the 11-year stretch from 1958 to 1968, the team in Orange won 47 and lost only 6 games played at Archbold Stadium. 

The stadium was occasionally used to stage Syracuse Stars minor league baseball games, such as in 1920 while the Stars were awaiting the completion of Star Park.

Description 

The stadium contained over 20,000 cubic yards of concrete over six acres, cost approximately $400,000 ($12 million in 2020 dollars) and was built in just over a year.

The 800' x 475' stadium was oval-shaped, with a track (originally dirt) and a natural grass football field.  The west end zone, the stadium's main entrance, was marked by a grand castle-like façade with two turrets framing the gateway cement arch. There was originally a wooden roof over the central section of the south grandstands for the reserved seating.

In the 1950s, the stadium was expanded to the north and south, bringing the capacity up to 40,000.  However, by the 1970s, stricter fire codes forced a reduction in capacity to 26,000.

Final years 
Toward the end of the 1970s, Syracuse University was under pressure to improve its football facilities in order to remain a Division I-A football school. The stadium could not be expanded due to fire codes. It was closed following the 1978 season, and Syracuse University decided to build a new stadium on the former footprint of Archbold, which, appropriately for Syracuse's often cold weather, was to have a domed Teflon-coated, fiberglass inflatable roof. The new stadium was named Carrier Dome (now JMA Wireless Dome).

In the final game at Archbold Stadium, on November 11, 1978, the Orangemen defeated nationally ranked Navy, 20-17.

References

External links

 Archbold Stadium - Syracuse University Archives
 Sanborn map showing the stadium, 1951

Sports venues in Syracuse, New York
Defunct college football venues
Demolished sports venues in New York (state)
Syracuse Orange football
Multi-purpose stadiums in the United States
Syracuse Orange sports venues
1907 establishments in New York (state)
Sports venues completed in 1907
1978 disestablishments in New York (state)
Sports venues demolished in 1979
American football venues in New York (state)
College soccer venues in the United States
College track and field venues in the United States
Athletics (track and field) venues in New York (state)
Defunct athletics (track and field) venues in the United States